Cirencester Town Council is a parish council in Gloucestershire formed in 1974, that serves an estimated 20,000 people. The town is divided into eight wards each electing two Councillors. The Councillors elect a Mayor each year who is also the Chairman of the Council. The current Mayor of Cirencester is Patrick Coleman.

Responsibilities 
Cirencester Town Council provide a variety of services and amenities for the town. These include management of CCTV, maintaining and improving parks, sport and recreation in the town, management of the historic charter and farmers markets, leading on community engagement and providing a youth service.

Current composition
Cirencester Town Council is elected every four years. The Liberal Democrats won 14 of the 16 seats on Cirencester Town Council at the 2019 Local Elections. Rather than form a political group all councillors agreed to work apolitically. Many of the Town Councillors also serve on Cotswold District Council (8 out of 16) and two Councillors also serve on Gloucestershire County Council.

Mayoral history

References

Parish councils of England
Local precepting authorities in England
Local authorities in Gloucestershire
Cirencester